Peter John Nero (born 27 June 1964) is a cricket umpire from Trinidad and Tobago.

Umpiring career
Nero made his list A cricket debut in 2007, umpiring his first-class cricket debut the year after.

See also
 List of One Day International cricket umpires
 List of Twenty20 International cricket umpires

References

1964 births
Living people
Trinidad and Tobago cricket umpires
West Indian One Day International cricket umpires
West Indian Twenty20 International cricket umpires